MoonEdit was a collaborative real-time text editor. It was released for Linux, Windows and FreeBSD. While the concept of real-time collaborative editing was famously demonstrated in 1968, MoonEdit was one of the first software products to fully implement it.

The software used code from Ken Silverman's BUILD game engine, and employed client-side prediction to reduce the effect of latency. Up to 14 participants could edit simultaneously, each having independent cursor positions updated in real time. Text added by each participant was highlighted a different color. Users could connect to a public server or set up their own dedicated server. MoonEdit servers listened on port 32123 by default. MoonEdit featured infinite undo history that could be browsed using a time-slider and replay button.

MoonEdit was originally written by Tom Dobrowolski under the name Multi-Editoro, while he was a student at Gdańsk University of Technology, in 2003. It could be downloaded for free for non-commercial use, but an announced commercial "PRO" version never appeared. Interest may have been lost due to the appearance of several web-based real-time editing platforms, starting with Writely (now Google Docs), around 2006. While the software is no longer developed, many other text editors have adopted its feature set, including Atom (using the Teletype extension) and Visual Studio Code (using the Live Share extension).

See also
 SubEthaEdit
 Gobby
 Etherpad

References

External links

How to connect to a MoonEdit-server? at wiki-Woodstock
community-wiki: MoonEdit - ideas and thoughts about the program, screenshots
teach-me-wiki, a wiki for organizing online lessons using MoonEdit and Skype.

Collaborative real-time editors